Deepak Devraj Komath (born 30 April 1978), better known as Deepak Dev, is an Indian music composer, best known for his compositions in Malayalam cinema. He started his career in the film Industry through the movie Chronic Bachelor (2003) directed by Siddique. Deepak is also a former member of the Kochi based Indian rock band Motherjane.

Early years
Deepak Dev is a native of Tellicherry in Kerala, and grew up in Dubai. He studied at the Indian High School there and learned Indian Carnatic music since childhood. Later his interest switched mainly to the keyboard. While a graduate student in Sacred Heart College, he was the mastermind behind the college rock band which went on to win the intercollege competition 'Talent Time – Woodstock' award every year. He focused on programming music and started working with reputed musicians like A.R Rahman, Shankar Ehsaan Loy, Sandeep Chowta, Vidyasagar, Anu Malik, M.M. Keeravani, Mani Sharma, and Adesh Shrivastav.

He started his career in Malayalam movies with Chronic Bachelor, directed by Siddique (of Siddique-Lal fame).

He said in an interview that he had almost given up on his musical career, soon after completing his graduation from Sacred Heart's College, Cochin, "as nothing exciting was happening in my career." However, every time he tried to sell his keyboard, it always came back to him, "as any guy who bought it from me with a mere small advance could never pile up the money that they had promised me for that keyboard and ended up giving it back to me. And soon after the third time it happened, the Siddique-Lal duo called me to join their group for their shows in the United States. They wanted me to render some music to fill the time in-between programs. As I got a chance to visit America, my intention was to get some job in the States like marketing, sales or anything other than music. During that time Mr.Siddique heard my composition and told me that 'I have good talent in music and I must take music as my career'   Eventually, it was those words gave me courage to take music as my career. "After that I came back to India I shifted base from Kerala to Chennai , that was in 1999. After few years I met Siddique and he asked me to compose music for his movie 'Chronic Bachelor', my first film".

Personal life
Deepak was born to Devraj Komath and Asha Dev based in Tellichery, who now live in Dubai. He has a younger brother, Dixit Dev. He was educated at The Indian High School, Dubai and at Sacred Heart College, Thevara. Deepak married Smitha Girijan on 26 May 2002. The couple now live in Ernakulam with their two daughters, Devika (born 2003) and Pallavi (born 2006).

Discography

Awards

Television shows

References

External links

 
Interview – part one 
Interview – part two 

Malayalam film score composers
Living people
1978 births